M250 can refer to:

M250 series, a Japanese freight train type
Allison Model 250, a British aircraft engine
M250 grenade launcher, an American grenade launcher
Lotus M250, a cancelled two-seat sports car concept
XM250, an American belt-fed machine gun